John Rafferty Jr. (born February 7, 1953) is an American  politician and former Republican member of the Pennsylvania State Senate who had represented the 44th District from 2003 to 2019. He was the Republican nominee for Attorney General of Pennsylvania in 2016 but was defeated by Democrat Josh Shapiro. In 2018, he was defeated for re-election by Democrat Katie Muth.

Career
Rafferty Jr. represented Pennsylvania's 44th senatorial district which includes parts of Berks, Chester and Montgomery Counties. He was re-elected for a fourth term in the Senate in November 2014.

Rafferty served as the Chairman of the Senate Transportation Committee. He also served as vice chairman of the Judiciary Committee and member of the Appropriations, Consumer Protection and Professional Licensure and Law and Justice Committees. Rafferty also previously served on the Pennsylvania Commission on Crime and Delinquency and in 2013 was appointed by the President Pro Tempore of the Senate to serve on the Pennsylvania Commission on Sentencing.

Prior to running for the Pennsylvania Senate, Rafferty served as an attorney in private practice focusing on education, real estate, zoning, business and estate law. As Deputy Attorney General for the Commonwealth from 1988 to 1991, he was assigned to the Criminal Law Division where his primary duty was investigating and prosecuting Medicaid fraud.

Rafferty was a member of the Methacton School Board from 1980 to 1984. He also represented Methacton in the operation of the Vo-Tech School as a member of the North Montco Vo-Tech Joint School Authority from 1981 to 1984. After serving on the Methacton School Board he was elected to serve as a member of the Lower Providence Township Board of Supervisors.

Education
Rafferty attended the University of Pittsburgh at Bradford and completed his bachelor's degree at Pitt-Johnstown. He received a master's degree from Beaver College and his Juris Doctor from Temple University Beasley School of Law.

References

External links
Rafferty for Attorney General official campaign website
Rafferty for Senate official campaign website
State Senator John Rafferty official PA Senate website
Project Vote Smart - Senator John Rafferty (PA) profile

University of Pittsburgh at Johnstown alumni
People from Montgomery County, Pennsylvania
Pennsylvania state senators
Living people
1953 births
Temple University Beasley School of Law alumni
21st-century American politicians